Patrick Bernard Kavanagh  (18 March 1923 – 11 December 2013) was a senior British police officer.

Kavanagh was educated at St. Aloysius' College, Glasgow. He served in the Rifle Brigade from 1941 to 1943 and the Parachute Regiment from 1943 to 1946, ending his service as a Lieutenant. In 1946, he joined  the Manchester City Police as a Constable. He rose through the ranks to Superintendent, and in 1964 was appointed Assistant Chief Constable of Cardiff City Police. When it amalgamated to form South Wales Constabulary in 1969 he became ACC of the new force and was promoted Deputy Chief Constable in 1972.

On 1 January 1974, he was appointed Assistant Commissioner "B" (Traffic) in the Metropolitan Police and was awarded the Queen's Police Medal (QPM) in the 1974 New Year Honours.

Kavanagh was appointed Commander of the Order of the British Empire (CBE) in the 1977 New Year Honours. On 1 August 1977, he was promoted to Deputy Commissioner. He retired in 1983 and died in 2013, aged 90.

Footnotes

References
Biography, Who Was Who

1923 births
2013 deaths
Police officers from Glasgow
British police chief officers
Assistant Commissioners of Police of the Metropolis
Deputy Commissioners of Police of the Metropolis
Commanders of the Order of the British Empire
Metropolitan Police recipients of the Queen's Police Medal
British Parachute Regiment officers
British Army personnel of World War II
People educated at St Aloysius' College, Glasgow